Hoseynabad (also romanized as Ḩoseynābād) is a village in Riz Rural District, Riz District, Jam County, Bushehr Province, Iran. At the 2006 census, its population was 288, in 62 families.

References 

Populated places in Jam County